General elections were held in Gibraltar on 16 September 1953. The Association for the Advancement of Civil Rights (AACR) remained the largest party in the legislature, winning three of the five elected seats.

Electoral system
The legislature was elected by single transferable vote.

Campaign
The AACR nominated three candidates rather than five to avoid risking some candidates being defeated through vote transfers. Its manifesto included the aim of a wholly elected Legislative Council and the scrapping of the single transferable vote system.

Results

Elected members

References

Gibraltar
General
General elections in Gibraltar
Election and referendum articles with incomplete results
September 1953 events in Europe